Rank is the relative position, value, worth, complexity, power, importance, authority, level, etc. of a person or object within a ranking, such as:

Level or position in a hierarchical organization
 Academic rank
 Diplomatic rank
 Hierarchy
 Hierarchy of the Catholic Church
 Military rank
 Police ranks of the United States
 Ranking member, [US politics] the most senior member of a committee from the minority party, and thus second-most senior member of a committee
 Imperial, royal and noble ranks

Level or position in society
Social class
Social position
Social status

Places
 Rank, Iran, a village
 Rank, Nepal, a village development committee

People
 Rank (surname), a list of people with the name

Arts, entertainment, and media

Music
 Rank (album), a live album by the Smiths
 "Rank", a song by Artwork from A Bugged Out Mix

Other arts, entertainment, and media
 Rank (chess), a row of the chessboard
 Rank (film), a short film directed by David Yates
 Rank, a set of pipes in a pipe organ

Brands and enterprises
 Rank Group Limited, an investment company owned by Graeme Hart
 The Rank Group plc, European gaming and leisure business
 The Rank Organisation, a British entertainment company formed in 1937, now part of the Rank Group

Computing and technology
 Rank (computer programming)
 Rank (J programming language)
 Memory rank, or ranking, of computer memory, a set of DRAM chips connected to the same chip select, and which are able to be accessed simultaneously

Mathematics
 Rank (differential topology)
 Rank (graph theory)
 Rank (linear algebra), the dimension of the vector space generated (or spanned) by a matrix's columns
 Rank (set theory)
 Rank (type theory)
 Rank of an abelian group, the cardinality of a maximal linearly independent subset
 Rank of a free module
 Rank of a greedoid, the maximal size of a feasible set
 Rank of a group, the smallest cardinality of a generating set for the group
 Rank of a Lie group – see Cartan subgroup 
 Rank of a matroid, the maximal size of an independent set
 Rank of a partition, at least two definitions in number theory
 Rank of a tensor
 Rank of a vector bundle
 Rank statistics

Science
 RANK, Receptor Activator of Nuclear Factor κ B, a type I membrane protein
 Taxonomic rank, in biology (species, genus, family, etc.)

Other uses
 Rank (formation), a line of soldiers standing abreast
 Rank, a grade of coal

See also